Asa'el, also known as Mitzpe Asa'el, is an Israeli outpost in the West Bank. Located three kilometres south-east of Shim'a, it falls under the jurisdiction of Har Hevron Regional Council. It was established in early 2002. Israeli outposts are considered illegal both under international law as well as under Israeli law.

It is named after Biblical Asahel from the time of King David.

In 2008 it was announced that the Yesha Council was making preparations to evacuate the outpost, but the evacuation didn't take place. The outpost continues to grow, with 60 new constructions registered between 2010 and 2020, and 12 new constructions done in 2021 alone.

References

External links
Asa'el Peace Now

Israeli settlements in the West Bank
Populated places established in 2002
Israeli outposts
Unauthorized Israeli settlements